Duke Akueteh Micah (born 16 September 1991) is a Ghanaian professional boxer who challenged for the WBO bantamweight title in September 2020. At regional level, he held multiple bantamweight titles, including the Commonwealth title in 2016. As an amateur he represented Ghana at the 2012 Summer Olympics.

Amateur career 
As an amateur, he competed in the Men's flyweight division at the 2012 Olympics. He won his first bout against Jason Lavigilante of Mauritius by 18 points to 14. In the second round, he was defeated by Michael Conlan of Ireland, losing by 19 points to 8.

Professional career 
He held the WBO Africa bantamweight title which he acquired in his twelfth bout, knocking out Ekow Wilson, also of Ghana, in the third round. Micah defended this title twice, first in a re-match with Wilson and then against Yaqub Kareem of Nigeria, both wins coming by way of knockout.

Micah vs. Casimero 
In 2020, he fought for the WBO bantamweight title and lost via third-round knockout to Johnriel Casimero. The fight was stopped by the referee with 54 seconds left in the third round.

Professional boxing record

See also
 Ghana at the 2012 Summer Olympics

References

External links
 Profile on London2012.com 
 Results on London2012.com 
 BBC Sport Online
Duke Micah - Profile, News Archive & Current Rankings at Box.Live

1991 births
Living people
Olympic boxers of Ghana
Boxers at the 2012 Summer Olympics
Boxers from Accra
Ghanaian male boxers
Bantamweight boxers
Commonwealth Boxing Council champions